Mount Simeon Subdistrict  is a subdistrict of Mount Simeon District in western Aleppo Governorate of northern Syria. Administrative centre is the city of Aleppo.

According to the 2004 census, the subdistrict had a population of 2,181,061.

The cities and towns in the subdistrict are:
 Aleppo
 Abtin
 Assan
 Ayn al-Kabira
 Azzan
 Duwayr al-Zaytun
 Haddadin
 Hilan
 Hreibel
 Kafr Saghir
 Khan Tuman
 Maghayer Khan Tuman
 Maratat al-Muslimiyah
 al-Muslimiyah
 al-Muslimiyah al-Shamaliyah
 Qarras
 Rasm Assan
 Saqlaya
 Siefat
 Tell Shair Samaan
 Tell Shughayb
 al-Dhahabiyah
 al-Wadihi

References 

Mount Simeon District
Mount Simeon